Frank Hodges  may refer to:
 Frank Hodges (trade unionist) (1887–1947), English trade union leader, General Secretary of the Miners' Federation of Great Britain
 Frank Hodges (footballer) (1891–1985), English footballer